"As I Please" was a series of articles written between 1943 and 1947 for the British left-wing newspaper Tribune by author and journalist George Orwell.

On resigning from his job at the BBC in November 1943, Orwell joined Tribune as literary editor. Over the next three-and-a-half years he wrote a series of columns, under the title "As I Please", that remain some of the greatest examples of their genre in the English language. The articles allowed Orwell to digress freely over whatever topics came into his mind, including reminiscences, nature observations, gleanings from books and thoughts on the political situation. Each article roamed from one theme to another without any need for formal continuity but had no title indicating the content.

The first article appeared in December 1943 and considered prevailing attitude to American servicemen in Britain. The last, in April 1947, covered the publication of social surveys by the Mass Observation research group, venereal diseases and begins the concluding section "For the last five minutes I have been gazing out of the window into the square, keeping a sharp look-out for first signs of spring".

Topics
Incomplete list

31 December 1943
War guilt

7 January 1944
New Year's honours

4 February 1944
Objective truth in history

25 February 1944
New ideas and progress

24 March 1944
What is Fascism?

14 April 1944
Declining birthrates, decaying belief in an afterlife

5 May 1944
Literary criticism

12 May 1944
Travel, economic self-sufficiency

19 May 1944
Killing of civilians in war, conspiracy theories

1 September 1944
The appeasement of the Leftist press towards the Soviet Union

8 November 1946
American fashion magazines, road safety campaigns, bread rationing

15 November 1946
Popular feeling against foreign immigration, slow hanging of war criminals

22 November 1946
Newspapers ranked by "Intelligence" and "Popularity"

29 November 1946
"Bad News" stories in newspapers, shortage of watches and clocks, return of the Jews to Palestine

6 December 1946
Antisemitic tone in Trilby by George du Maurier, recommendation of middle-age retirement for writers (H. G. Wells), printing of four-letter words

13 December 1946
UNO and other international conferences, issues of national sovereignty

20 December 1946
Christmas - in praise of indulgence and conviviality in disregard for vegetarians and teetotallers.

27 December 1946
How modern knowledge has to depend on authority rather than reasoning, Laski's libel case, disgusting American 'comics'

3 January 1947
On a liner to Burma when a quartermaster scavenges a custard pie, literary purge in the USSR and expulsion of writers from the Writer's Union, thoughts of Marcus Aurelius as an incentive to getting up in the morning

17 January 1947
Flawed report in the Daily Herald on Indians who broadcast on Nazi radio, In Darkest Germany post-war starvation in Germany, dogs over-indulged at Christmas, stupid expressions

24 January 1947
Scottish businessmen and their attitudes to Polish refugees, Petain at Foch's funeral and Queen Mary in Windsor

31 January 1947 (As I Pleased)
Personal experiences of Tribune as a reader, writer and observer

7 February 1947
The need for a good D-I-Y guide. dirtiness of snow, Burmese independence and the problem of autonomy of minority groups within minority groups, misprints by H. G. Wells and his lack of self-criticism

14 February 1947
Scottish Nationalism as a form of race-hatred, the case for keeping the Gaelic language alive, political content in a commercial circular letter from a whisky distiller, amusing epitaphs

7 March 1947
The need for an improved anthology of modern English poetry

14 March 1947
Simplifying English spelling and traditional imperial units, food parcel confiscations, an experience in teaching history

28 March 1947
"Mass Observation", social surveys and the financial determination of what is surveyed, venereal diseases, the first signs of spring

See also
Bibliography of George Orwell

References

External links
The As I Please columns online

Essays by George Orwell
Works originally published in Tribune (magazine)
1943 essays
1944 essays
1945 essays
1946 essays
1947 essays